Bazourieh       is a municipality in Southern Lebanon, located in Tyre District, Governorate of South Lebanon.

Name
According to E. H. Palmer, the name  means "producing pot-herbs".

History
In 1596, it was named as a village,  al-Bazuri, in the Ottoman nahiya (subdistrict) of  Tibnin  under the liwa' (district) of Safad, with a population of  22  households, all Muslim. The villagers paid a  fixed tax rate of 25% on  agricultural products, such as wheat, barley, summer crops, fruit trees, goats and beehives, in addition to occasional revenues; a total of 4,243 akçe.

In 1881, the PEF's Survey of Western Palestine (SWP) described it: "A village built of stone, containing 300 Metawileh, situated on a ridge. One oil-press and one rock-cut cistern are the only antiquities. Water is obtained from a spring half a mile to the west."

Other
Bazouriyeh is the ancestral home of Hassan Nasrallah.

References

Bibliography

External links
Bazouriyeh, Localiban
Survey of Western Palestine, Map 1:  IAA, Wikimedia commons 

Populated places in Tyre District
Shia Muslim communities in Lebanon